The Imha Dam is an embankment dam on the Banbyeoncheon River, a tributary of the Nakdong River,  east of Andong in Gyeongsangbuk-do province, South Korea. The purpose of the dam is flood control, water supply and hydroelectric power generation. Construction on the dam began in 1987 and it was complete in 1991. It supplies water for both municipal and industrial uses to Gumi, Dagu, Masan, Changwon, Jinhae, Ulsan, and Busan.

See also

List of power stations in South Korea

References

Dams in South Korea
Hydroelectric power stations in South Korea
Rock-filled dams
Andong
Buildings and structures in North Gyeongsang Province
Dams completed in 1991
1991 establishments in South Korea
20th-century architecture in South Korea